Sadık Pekünlü (21 July 1938 – 14 July 1973) was a Turkish weightlifter. He competed in the men's middle heavyweight event at the 1964 Summer Olympics.

References

External links
 

1938 births
1973 deaths
Turkish male weightlifters
Olympic weightlifters of Turkey
Weightlifters at the 1964 Summer Olympics
Sportspeople from Istanbul